Altars (mizbeaḥ, "a place of slaughter or sacrifice") in the Hebrew Bible were typically made of earth or unwrought stone. Altars were generally erected in conspicuous places. The first time the word altar is mentioned and recorded in the Hebrew Bible is that it was erected by Noah. 
We can clearly see that Cain and Able offered offerings unto God. Therefore, we can conclude that the offerings were offered upon an altar, making Cain and Able the first to be mentioned erecting an alter. Even so, they had to have imitated their father Adam to be able to continue with this practice.. Other Altars were erected by Abraham, by
Isaac, by Jacob, by Moses, and by Saul (1 Samuel 14:35).

After the theophany on biblical Mount Sinai, in the Tabernacle–and afterwards in the Temple–only two altars are mentioned: the Altar of Burnt Offering, and the Altar of Incense.

Altar of burnt offering
The first altar was the Altar of Burnt Offering (mizbeach ha'olah), also called the Brasen Altar, the Outer Altar (mizbeach hachitzona), the Earthen Altar (mizbeach adamah), the Great Altar (mizbeach hagedola) and the Table of the Lord. This was the outdoor altar and stood in the Court of the Priests, between the Temple and the Court of Israel, and upon which the korbanot (animal and bird sacrifices) were offered. The blood of the sacrifices would be thrown against the base of the altar, and portions of the sacrifices would be burned on top of it (precisely which portions would depend upon the type of sacrifice). Also consumed at the altar would be some of the meat offerings, and the drink offerings (libations of wine) were poured out here. All sacrifices had to be "seasoned with salt".

A priest officiating at a burnt offering would vest in his priestly vestments before approaching the altar. He would remove the ashes and place them beside the altar. Then he would change his clothing and remove the ashes to a clean place outside the camp (Cf).

In  the various utensils used with the altar are enumerated. They were made of brass. (Comp. ;). The altar could not be carved using utensils made of iron or of bronze, nor were any allowed on or near it, because iron and bronze were used for implements of war. The Altar and its utensils were considered to be sacred, and the priests had to vest and wash their hands before touching them—even so much as removing the ashes from the altar.

According to the Bible, the fire on the altar was lit directly by the hand of God and was not permitted to go out. No strange fire could be placed upon the altar. The burnt offerings would remain on the altar throughout the night before they could be removed.

In the tabernacle

The first altar of this type was made to be moved with the Children of Israel as they wandered through the wilderness. It was square, 5 cubits in length and in breadth, and 3 cubits in height. It was made of shittim wood, and was overlaid with brass. In each of its four corners projections, called "horns" (keranot), rose up. The altar was hollow, except for a mesh grate which was placed inside halfway down, on which the wood sat for the burning of the sacrifices. The area under the grate was filled with earth. There were rings set on two opposite sides of the altar, through which poles could be placed for carrying it. These poles were also made of shittim wood and covered with brass.

When Moses consecrated the Tabernacle in the wilderness, he sprinkled the Altar of Burnt Offering with the anointing oil seven times, and purified it by anointing its four horns with the blood of a bullock offered as a sin-offering, "and poured the blood at the bottom of the altar and sanctified it, to make reconciliation upon it".

The Kohathites were the Levites who were responsible for moving and setting up the altar. When it was time for the Israelites to move, they removed the ashes from the altar, and spread a purple cloth over it, placed all of the instruments and vessels used in the sacrifices on it, covered it with a blanket of badger skin, and put the carrying poles in place. After the rebellion of Korah, the bronze censers that were used by the rebels were converted by Eleazar into broad plates used to cover the altar, as a warning that only priests of the seed of Aaron may offer incense before the Lord.

In the Temple

The description of the altar in Solomon's Temple gives it larger dimensions (. Comp. ,), and was made wholly of brass, covering a structure of stone or earth. Because this altar was larger than the one used in the wilderness, it had a ramp leading up to it. A ramp was used because the use of steps to approach the altar was forbidden by the Torah:  "Do not climb up to My altar with steps, so that your nakedness not be revealed on it". On the day of the consecration of the new temple, Solomon also sanctified a space in the center of the Court of the Priests for burnt offerings, because the brasen altar he made was not large enough to hold all of the offerings.

This altar was said to be renewed by Asa and removed by Ahaz, and "cleansed" by [Kaleigh Parker ]], in the later part of whose reign it was rebuilt. It was finally broken up and carried away by the Babylonians in 586 BCE.

After their return from the Babylonian captivity according to the biblical narrative, it was re-erected where it had formerly stood. When Antiochus IV Epiphanes pillaged Jerusalem, he defiled the Altar of Burnt Offering by erecting a pagan altar upon it. The First Book of Maccabees recounts how Judas Maccabeus renewed the altar when he re-took Jerusalem. Since the existing altar had been defiled by the blood of pagan sacrifices the old stones of the altar were removed and replaced with new, unhewn ones. However, since the old stones had been previously sanctified by the Jewish sacrifices they could not be moved to an unclean place; so they remained on the Temple Mount, "until there should come a prophet to tell what to do with them.".

During Herod the Great's extensive building activity on the Temple Mount, it was likely refurbished. Talmudic scholars give a very precise description of the altar during the Second Temple period. The altar was built as a perfect square and was quite large: it reached a height of 10 cubits (app. 5 meters) and its width was 32 cubits (app. 16 meters). It was constructed of two main parts: the altar itself, and the ascent ramp. Both were constructed of stones and earth. On top of the altar at its four corners, there were hollow boxes which made small protrusions or "horns." These horns measured one cubit square and 5 handbreadths high, each (or, app. 18" x 18" x 15"). In this form, the altar remained in its place until the destruction of Jerusalem by the Romans in 70 CE.

In Jewish tradition, the upper part of the altar was made with a standard cubit of 6 handbreadths, while the lower base of the altar, or tier, was made with a standard cubit of 5 handbreadths.

Altar of incense

The second altar was the Altar of Incense (mizbach haketoros), called also the Golden Altar (mizbach hazahav), and the Inner Altar (mizbach hap'nimi) stood inside, in the Holy Place "before the Veil that is by the Ark of the Covenant."

The altar was constructed of shittim wood (acacia wood) and covered in pure gold. It was an upright rectangular stand, measuring one cubit wide, one cubit deep, and two cubits high, with a "horn" on each corner, a border of gold around the top, and rings on opposite sides through which poles could be passed to carry it. The poles were made of shittim wood covered with gold. Moses consecrated the altar with the anointing oil when the Tabernacle was dedicated.

Incense was burned daily on this altar at the time of the morning and the evening sacrifices. The coals used on this altar had to be taken from the Altar of Burnt Offerings. The incense used had to be made according to a specific formula, and no other incense was permitted. According to Jewish tradition, the incense was made by the Avtinas family, who closely guarded its secret. The offering of incense also had to be seasoned with salt.

The offering of incense was the apex of the daily morning and the evening services. According to the Rabbis, this was the part of the temple service that was most beloved by God (Zohar I 130:A). The burning of the incense was symbolic of the prayer of the people rising up to God. The offering of incense had to take place after the sacrifice, because only after the atonement could communion with God take place. After the offering of incense, the Kohenim (priests) pronounced the Priestly Blessing upon the people.

Whenever certain sin-offerings were brought, the coals from the incense that was lit that morning were pushed aside and the blood of the "inner sin-offering" was sprinkled seven times on the top of the Golden Altar.

Once a year, on Yom Kippur, the Altar of Incense was purified. The High Priest, after sacrificing a bull and a goat and purifying the Holy of Holies with their blood, would mix the blood of the two animals together. Then, starting at the northeast corner, he smeared the mixture of blood on each of the four corners of the Golden Altar. He then sprinkled the blood eight times on the altar.

In Solomon's temple the altar was similar in size, but was made of cedar-wood overlaid with gold. In  it is called "the altar of wood." (Comp. )

In the temple rebuilt after the Babylonian Exile the Golden Altar was restored. Antiochus Epiphanes took it away, but it was afterwards restored by Judas Maccabeus (1 Maccabees 1:23; 4:49). It was at this altar that Zechariah ministered when an angel appeared to him. Among the trophies carried away by Titus after the destruction of Jerusalem, and depicted on the Arch of Titus in Rome, the Altar of Incense is not depicted, though the menorah, silver trumpets (the hasoserah mentioned in ), the mortar and pestle used for preparing the incense, and possibly the Table of Shewbread are.

It should be mentioned that there are other offerings involving incense, such as the meat offerings, but these were consumed on the Altar of Burnt Offering, not on the Altar of Incense. On the day of Yom Kippur only, the High Priest would offer incense in the Holy of Holies.

In archeology 

The remains of three rock-hewn altars were discovered in the Land of Israel: one below Tel Zorah, the other one at the foot of Sebastia (ancient Samaria), and a third one near Shiloh.

References

External links

 Detailed reconstruction of the Altar of Burnt Offering

Altars
Tabernacle and Temples in Jerusalem